John Collins Covell (December 19, 1823 – June 4, 1887) was a 19th-century American educator and school administrator specializing in deaf education in the U.S. states of Virginia and West Virginia.

Born in 1823 in Rhode Island, Covell was the son of Episcopal minister Reverend Joseph S. Covell and the grandson of Rhode Island Governor John Collins. Covell attended Trinity College and graduated from the institution in 1847. He was recommended as a candidate for Holy Orders in the Episcopal Diocese of Connecticut and received the orders of a deacon.

Covell accepted a teaching position in the Deaf Department of the Virginia School for the Deaf and the Blind and relocated there in 1847. Covell was made a vice-principal of the institution and given charge of the entire Deaf Mute Department in 1852. During the American Civil War, Covell entered the Confederate States Army with the rank of major and served on the staff of Brigadier General Henry A. Wise. Covell served on General Wise's staff only briefly before returning to the Virginia School for the Deaf and Blind to serve as its principal in 1862, a position he held until 1872. In 1874, Covell was selected to serve as the principal of the West Virginia Schools for the Deaf and Blind. Under his leadership, the West Virginia Schools for the Deaf and Blind experienced "unprecedented success" and its student body began to grow due to his initiatives. He served as the institution's principal until his death in 1887.

Covell was an active and prominent member of the Episcopal Diocese of West Virginia and was appointed the first churchwarden of Saint Stephen's Episcopal Church in Romney. Covell played an instrumental role in the construction of the church through his donation of property for the building site and his financial contribution of the majority of its construction costs.

Early life and education 
John Collins Covell was born on December 19, 1823, in Newport, Rhode Island, and was the son of Episcopal minister, Reverend Joseph S. Covell. Covell was named for his maternal grandfather, Rhode Island Governor John Collins. He spent his childhood in Princess Anne, Maryland, where he received his education from the common schools for eight years before attending an academy in Connecticut. Covell then worked as a store clerk for three years. Seeking to further his education, Covell attended Trinity College in Hartford, Connecticut, and graduated from the institution in 1847. After graduating from Trinity College, Covell was recommended as a candidate for Holy Orders in the Episcopal Diocese of Connecticut and received the orders of a deacon in the Episcopal Church.

Educator and school administrator

Virginia School for the Deaf and the Blind
Upon graduating from Trinity College, Covell accepted a teaching position in the Deaf Department of the Virginia School for the Deaf and the Blind in Staunton, Virginia and relocated there in September 1847. Covell continued teaching until 1852 when he was made a vice-principal of the institution and given charge of the entire Deaf Mute Department.

Following the outbreak of the American Civil War in 1861, Covell entered the Confederate States Army with the rank of major and served on the staff of Brigadier General Henry A. Wise. Covell served on General Wise's staff only briefly before the state of Virginia recalled him to the Virginia School for the Deaf and Blind in 1862 to become the institution's principal. According to the National Conference of Superintendents and Principals of Institutions for Deaf Mutes in 1888, the state of Virginia considered Covell's services "of more value as manager of one of her noblest public institutions than as a soldier in the field." While serving as principal, Covell continued to head and instruct in the school's Deaf Mute Department. Covell remained principal of the Virginia School for the Deaf and Blind for nine years until his resignation from the institution in 1872.

In an 1870 address entitled "The Nobility, Dignity, and Antiquity of the Sign Language" which Covell delivered at the Convention of American Instructors of the Deaf in Indianapolis, Indiana, he asserted that sign language would gain in popularity among hearing people and would be taught alongside philology as part of the basic curricula of universities. Over a century after Covell's 1870 prediction, American Sign Language has been added to curricula of language departments in a growing number of American universities.

West Virginia Schools for the Deaf and Blind 

In June–July 1874, Covell was selected by the Board of Regents of the West Virginia Schools for the Deaf and Blind in Romney, West Virginia to serve as the institution's principal, and he began his tenure there in August of that year. Upon his arrival, Covell found the schools "in a chaotic condition" with decreasing attendance, but the situation improved after Covell provided leadership, order, and a process of reorganization. Under his leadership, the West Virginia Schools for the Deaf and Blind experienced "unprecedented success" and its student body began to grow due to Covell's initiatives. Covell found that 12 out of West Virginia's 54 counties had no representatives at the schools, so he urged the Board of Regents to canvass the state for students eligible to attend the institution. The board approved Covell's recommendation, and the resulting investigation identified students in those counties, which validated Covell's request. By the schools' tenth anniversary in 1880, the West Virginia Schools for the Deaf and Blind's attendance reached 120, consisting of 87 "deaf-mute" and 33 blind students. At his death in 1887, the institution had grown from a student body of 60 pupils in 1874 to 130.

Among his other reforms, Covell undertook to modernize the facilities of the West Virginia Schools for the Deaf and Blind by urging the state to install gas lighting and to install plumbing for the purposes of providing tap water. In addition to the school's infrastructure, Covell overhauled the school's levels of comprehension in 1875 by introducing a classification system in which students were arranged in grades. Covell also introduced the tradition of publishing biennial reports, then annual reports, which have continued to be released every year since 1876. In 1877, at Covell's recommendation, the schools' board established the Department of Visible Speech in which deaf-mute students were instructed in the manner of articulation and lip reading.

As an educator, Covell was described as "an instructor of rare ability, being well-versed in literature, science, and the arts" and as "a gentleman of fine abilities and ripe experience". He had great personal influence on his students and took an interest in their religious well-being. Covell continued serving as principal of the West Virginia Schools for the Deaf and Blind until his death from stomach cancer on Saturday, June 4, 1887, in Romney. Known for his excellence as an executive and administrative officer, all his affairs were found by the president of the school's Board of Regents "to be finished, so that nothing remained to be done" on the day of his death.

Following his death, Covell was honored in 1888 at the National Conference of Superintendents and Principals of Institutions for Deaf Mutes in Jackson, Mississippi, by W. O. Connor, Principal of the Georgia School for the Deaf, who stated:

His obituary in The Churchman remarked of Covell:

Personal life 
Covell married on December 24, 1850, in Staunton, Virginia to Anita "Annie" E. Eskridge (June 18, 1810 – July 26, 1895). Covell is interred with his wife Annie at Indian Mound Cemetery in Romney. He and his wife had five children together, including two daughters:

Covell was an active and prominent member of the Episcopal Diocese of West Virginia and belonged to Saint Stephen's Episcopal Church in Romney. He was appointed the first churchwarden of Saint Stephen's by Bishop of the Episcopal Diocese of West Virginia, George William Peterkin. Covell played an instrumental role in the construction of a church for Saint Stephen's in 1885 through his donation of property for the building site across the Northwestern Turnpike from the West Virginia Schools for the Deaf and Blind and through his financial contribution of the majority of the $1,800 USD construction cost. Covell's efforts were described in The Churchman as the "crowning work of his life." Prior to the church's construction, it is likely Covell that allowed Saint Stephen's to utilize the chapel at the West Virginia Schools for the Deaf and Blind to hold their services. In addition to his affiliation with the Episcopal Church, Covell was a Mason of "high standing" and a member of the Romney Literary Society.

References

Bibliography

External links
 

1823 births
1887 deaths
19th-century American clergy
19th-century American educators
19th-century American Episcopalians
19th-century American male writers
American education writers
American Episcopal clergy
American school principals
American school superintendents
Burials at Indian Mound Cemetery
Confederate States Army officers
Deaths from stomach cancer
Education in Hampshire County, West Virginia
Educators of the deaf
Episcopalians from Rhode Island
Episcopalians from Virginia
Episcopalians from West Virginia
Schoolteachers from Rhode Island
Schoolteachers from Virginia
Schoolteachers from West Virginia
Members of the Romney Literary Society
Northern-born Confederates
People from Princess Anne, Maryland
People from Romney, West Virginia
People from Staunton, Virginia
People of the West Virginia Schools for the Deaf and Blind
People of Virginia in the American Civil War
Trinity College (Connecticut) alumni
Writers from Newport, Rhode Island
Writers from Virginia
Writers from West Virginia